The South Island giant moa (Dinornis robustus) is an extinct species of moa from the genus Dinornis. It was quite the superlative bird, owning the title of the tallest-known bird species to walk the Earth.

Taxonomy 
The moa were ratites, flightless birds with a sternum and without a keel. They also had a distinctive palate. The origin of these birds is becoming clearer, and it is now believed that early ancestors of these birds were able to fly and flew to the southern areas in which they have been found.

Despite being geologically closer to the kiwis, moas are a sister group to the South American tinamou. 

South island giant moas, as well as their close cousins of the North Island, are placed within their own family, Dinornithidae. These, along with the upland moa, are among the most basal of the order.

Description

Size 
The South Island giant moa was the largest species of moa. Despite their great height, Dinornis robustus was found to have weighed only  on average, with upper estimates of around ≥ for ♀. Only one specimen of complete or partially complete moa egg has been assigned to the South Island giant moa, found around Kaikōura.

Anatomy 
Very large-bodied, they had proportionately small heads, a trait synonymous with ratites. Analysis of their skull show that they had somewhat poor eyesight due to their small orbits, rounded bills, and a very acute sense of smell thanks to a strongly developed olfactory system. Dinornis spp. had thinner leg bones than other moa, indicating that they were more agile than other moa, though likely moved slowly and sluggishly. Unusually, giant moas were the only large ratites that sported a hallux (Digit I). Uniquely, the moas were essentially wingless; the only remnant of a wing was the scapulocoracoid bone, which, at one point earlier in its evolution, is where the humerus would have been.

Appearance 
Giant moas were likely fully feathered, except for their heads and a small portion of the neck, and the tarsus and feet. There have been feathers found belonging to this species, revealing that its plumage was plain brown or slightly streaked.

Behavior & Ecology 
D. robustus, along with its relatives, were quite eccentric birds. Although they could reach 11+ feet in height, they mostly held their necks horizontally rather than vertically, like their distant relatives, the kiwis.

Feeding 
Moa most likely filled a diurnal role in their ecosystem, similar to that of emus. Because New Zealand lacked any native terrestrial, herbivorous mammals, the moas filled that niche. Giant moas in particular are ecologically equivalent to giraffes and other large plant-eating megafauna, though lack any living analogs in New Zealand. These birds sported a very robust bill, an adaptation for a highly fibrous diet. Most foraging took place in forests and open fields. Fossilized coprolites reveal the diet of D. robustus included twigs, seeds, berries, leaves, flowers, vines, herbs and shrubs. It's likely that this species fed on vegetation that was unable to be digested by other species, therefore avoiding competition with other species. Their bill allowed them to feed by means of cutting and breaking twigs and stems via lateral shaking. In addition to their bills, moas had stronger neck muscles than other ratite families, which might have given them a stronger pulling/tugging force. They also could use their necks to reach higher levels if necessary.

Reproduction 
Giant moas likely were long-lived and took many years to reach full maturation. Similar to cassowaries, females likely were in competition for males, seeing that they were dramatically much larger. The males likely primarily reared the chicks, as the female would have been too large to incubate the weak-shelled eggs; however, the method of incubation is still unknown. As mentioned before, moas laid very easily-breakable eggs. They nested in rock shelters during late spring to early summer. Chicks are speculated to have been striped like those of other ratites.

Range 
It lived in the South Island of New Zealand as well as in Rakiura, and its habitat was the lowlands (shrubland, duneland, grassland, and forests). Along with other members of the moa family, the South Island giant moa went extinct due to predation from humans in the centuries following human colonization.

References

Sources
 
 
 Gill, B. J. (2006). "A Catalogue of Moa Eggs (Aves: Dinornithiformes)". Records of the Auckland Museum. 43: 55–80. .
 Gill, B. J.; Bell, B. D.; Chambers, G. K.; Medway, D. G.; Palma, R. L.; Scofield, R. P.; Tennyson, A. J. D.; Worthy, T. H. (2010). Checklist of the Birds of New Zealand, Norfolk and Macquarie Islands, and the Ross Dependency, Antarctica. 4th ed. Ornithological Society of New Zealand. Te Papa Press. Retrieved 30 October 2022.
 Perry, George L. W.; Wheeler, Andrew B.; Wood, Jamie R.; Wilmshurst, Janet M. (1 December 2014). "A high-precision chronology for the rapid extinction of New Zealand moa (Aves, Dinornithiformes)". Quaternary Science Reviews. 105: 126–135. . Retrieved 30 October 2022.
 Szabo, M. J. (2013). "South Island giant moa". In Miskelly, C.M. (ed.). New Zealand Birds Online.
 Verry, Alexander J. F.; Schmidt, Matthew; Rawlence, Nicolas J. (15 November 2021). "A partial skeleton provides evidence for the former occurrence of moa populations on Rakiura Stewart Island". New Zealand Journal of Ecology. 46 (1).

External links
 "South Island Giant Moa. Dinornis robustus. From the series: Extinct birds of New Zealand". Artwork by Paul Martinson [Tennyson, Alan (2006). Extinct Birds of New Zealand. Wellington: Te Papa Press].

South Island giant moa
Birds of the South Island
Holocene extinctions
Extinct flightless birds
Extinct birds of New Zealand
Late Quaternary prehistoric birds
Ratites
South Island giant moa